The 1994 season was the third full year of competitive football (soccer) in Estonia since gaining independence from the Soviet Union on 20 August 1991.

National Leagues

Meistriliiga

Esiliiga

Estonian FA Cup

Quarterfinals

Semifinals

Final

National team

Senior team

Notes

External links
1993–1994 season on RSSSF
RSSSF Historic Results
RSSSF National Team Results
RSSSF Baltic Cup 1994

 
Seasons in Estonian football